Phenacovolva patriciae is a species of sea snail, a marine gastropod mollusc in the family Ovulidae, the ovulids, cowry allies or false cowries.

Description

Distribution

References

 Nolf F. 2008. A forgotten species from Angola, described as Phenacovolva patriciae (Mollusca: Gastropoda: Ovulidae) Neptunea 7(1): 1–3, pl. I-III

Endemic fauna of Angola
Ovulidae
Gastropods described in 2008